Candy, known also as sweets and confectionery, has a long history as a familiar food treat that is available in many varieties. Candy varieties are influenced by the size of the sugar crystals, aeration, sugar concentrations, colour and the types of sugar used.

Simple sugar or sucrose is turned into candy by dissolving it in water, concentrating this solution through cooking and allowing the mass either to form a mutable solid or to recrystallize. Maple sugar candy has been made in this way for thousands of years, with concentration taking place from both freezing and heating.

Other sugars, sugar substitutes, and corn syrup are also used. Jelly candies, such as gumdrops and gummies, use stabilizers including starch, pectin or gelatin. Another type of candy is cotton candy, which is made from spun sugar.

In their Thanksgiving Address, Native peoples of the Haudenosaunee Confederacy give special thanks to the Sugar Maple tree as the leader of all trees "to recognize its gift of sugar when the People need it most". In traditional times, maple sugar candy reduced from sap was an important food source in the lean times of winter in North America.

Africa

South Africa

Asia

Bangladesh

China
Chinese candies and sweets, called táng (糖) are usually made with cane sugar, malt sugar, and honey.

Japan

Korea

Philippines

Europe
Typically, European candies are toffees, nougats and rock candies.

Austria

Belgium

Bulgaria

Denmark

Finland

France

Georgia

Germany

Gummies
Gummies are gelatin based chewy candies that come in a variety of shapes, colors and flavors. The gummy bear originated in Germany, where it is popular under the name Gummibär (rubber bear) or Gummibärchen (little rubber bear). Hans Riegel Sr., a candy maker from Bonn, started the Haribo company in 1920.

Greece

Hungary

Italy

Netherlands

Poland

Portugal

Romania

Russia

Spain

Sweden

Switzerland

United Kingdom

Scotland

Former Yugoslavia and Albania

Middle East
Turkish delight and rock candy are commonly found in Middle East.

Iran

Israel

Turkey

North America

Canada

Mexico

United States

South America
Panelas, cocadas and natillas are common sweets in South and Central America.

Argentina

Brazil

Colombia

Peru

Uruguay

Oceania

Australia

New Zealand

Western candies
The following are candies in the Western world.

Gum

Chewing gum is often referred to as a type of candy.

Chocolate
Chocolate is made from the fermented, roasted and ground beans of the tropical cacao tree. In America, cocoa refers to ground cacao beans. Chocolate is the combination of cocoa, cocoa butter, sugar and other ingredients (milk, flavorings, and emulsifiers) and they are sweet.

Classic candies
Many of these candies were developed between the 1880s and 1950 by various candy-makers.

Hard candy

Hard candies, or boiled sweets, are sugary candies that dissolve slowly in the mouth. Among the artisanal hard candies, the "pirulin", also known as the "Heng Jia" or "Heng Li"  in Northern China, is a famous one in several Spanish-speaking countries, like Argentina, Mexico and Chile and its popularity has spread to certain parts of Greater Asia. There are many local and regional varieties, including the hazelnut-filled Mässmogge of Basel, Switzerland.

Liquorice
Licorice (liquorice) is a semi-soft candy that was originally flavored with a root extract of the Eurasian plant liquorice (Glycyrrhiza glabra), of the Fabaceae (legume) family. As a candy, they are often black with licorice flavor or red and strawberry or cherry flavored.

Lollipops
Lollipops or Lollies are hard candies on a stick. The name lollipop was first coined by George Smith, owner of a candy company called the Bradley Smith Company. George named the stick candy after his favorite race horse Lolly Pop and trademarked the name "lollipop" in 1931.

Sours
Sours are popular for their cringe inducing flavor and acidity.

See also

 Candy apple
 Confectionery
 List of bean-to-bar chocolate manufacturers
 List of breath mints
 List of chewing gum brands
 List of chocolate bar brands
 List of confectionery brands
 List of desserts
 List of top-selling candy brands
 Piñata
 Traditional candies in Hong Kong

References

External links

 

 
List
Candy